Johann Richter (15 February 1896 – 18 August 1975) was an Austrian footballer. He played in ten matches for the Austria national football team from 1923 to 1927.

References

External links
 

1896 births
1975 deaths
Austrian footballers
Austria international footballers
Place of birth missing
Association footballers not categorized by position